Muhammad Mukhtar al-Khatib (born 1942) is a Sudanese politician, currently serving as the General Secretary of the Sudanese Communist Party. He succeeded longtime party leader Muhammad Ibrahim Nugud following his death on 22 March 2012.

References

1942 births
Living people
Place of birth missing (living people)
Sudanese Communist Party politicians